The Gascon-Thomas Award is a Canadian theatre award created in 1990. It is awarded by the National Theatre School of Canada to two artists, one English-speaking and one French-speaking, and is named after two of the school's founders, Jean Gascon and Powys Thomas. The award was designed by Montreal artist Annie Michaud.

Award winners

References 

Canadian theatre awards
Awards established in 1990
1990 establishments in Canada
National Theatre School of Canada